Richard Joseph Anuszkiewicz (May 23, 1930 – May 19, 2020) was an American painter, printmaker, and sculptor.

Life and work
Anuszkiewicz was born in Erie, Pennsylvania, the son of Victoria (Jankowski) and Adam Anuszkiewicz, who worked in a paper mill. His parents were Polish immigrants. He first studied art under Joseph Plavcan while still in high school, later describing him as his most significant influence. Anuszkiewicz trained at the Cleveland Institute of Art in Cleveland, Ohio (1948–1953), and then with Josef Albers at the Yale University School of Art in New Haven, Connecticut (1953–1955), where he earned his Masters of Fine Arts.

He was one of the founders and foremost exponents of Op Art, a movement during the late 1960s and early 1970s. Victor Vasarely in France and Bridget Riley in England were his primary international counterparts. In 1964, Life magazine called him "one of the new wizards of Op". While reflecting on a New York City gallery show of Anuszkiewicz's from 2000, New York Times art critic Holland Cotter described Anuszkiewicz's paintings: "The drama — and that feels like the right word — is in the subtle chemistry of complementary colors, which makes the geometry glow as if light were leaking out from behind it." Anuszkiewicz exhibited at the Venice Biennale, Florence Biennale and Documenta, and his works are in permanent collections internationally. He was elected into the National Academy of Design in 1992 as an Associate member, and became a full member in 1994.

Style 

Anuszkiewicz was concerned with the optical changes that occur when different high-intensity colors are applied to the same geometric configurations. Most of his work comprises visual investigations of formal structural and color effects, many of them nested square forms similar to the work of his mentor Josef Albers. In his series, "Homage to the Square", Albers experimented with juxtapositions of color, and Anuszkiewicz developed these concepts further. Anuszkiewicz continued to produce works in the Op Art style over the subsequent decades of his career.

In 1963, Anuszkiewicz summarized his approach to painting as: "My work is of an experimental nature and has centered on an investigation into the effects of complementary colors of full intensity when juxtaposed and the optical changes that occur as a result, and a study of the dynamic effect of the whole under changing conditions of light, and the effect of light on color."

Selected collections holding works

 Akron Art Museum, Akron, Ohio
 Albright-Knox Art Gallery, Buffalo
 Art Institute of Chicago
 Blanton Museum of Art, University of Texas
 Boca Raton Museum of Art
 Carnegie Museum of Art, Pittsburgh
 Chicago Museum of Contemporary Art
 Cleveland Museum of Art
 Columbus Museum of Art
 Denver Art Museum
 Detroit Institute of Arts
 Flint Institute of Arts
 Fogg Museum, Harvard University
 The Governor Nelson A. Rockefeller Empire State Plaza Art Collection
 Hokkaido Museum of Modern Art
 Honolulu Museum of Art
 Indiana University Art Museum, Bloomington
 Metropolitan Museum of Art, New York
 Museum of Contemporary Art Jacksonville
 Museum of Modern Art, New York
 Philadelphia Museum of Art, Philadelphia
 Guggenheim Museum, New York
 Wadsworth Atheneum, Hartford
 Whitney Museum of Art, New York

Grants and awards 
 1953: Pulitzer Traveling Fellowship
 1963: Charles of the Ritz Oil Painting Award
 1964: The Silvermine Guild Award for Oil Painting
 1977: Cleveland Arts Prize
 1980: Hassam Fund Purchase Award
 1988: Hassam Fund Purchase Award
 1994: New York State Art Teachers' Association Award
 1995: Emil and Dines Carlson Award
 1996: New Jersey Pride Award
 1997: Richard Florsheim Fund Grant
 2000: Lee Krasner Award
 2005: Lorenzo dei Medici Career Award, awarded at the Florence Biennale

Exhibitions 

Anuskiewicz exhibited in many public collections around the world, including such New York galleries as Sidney Janis, The Contemporaries, and the Andrew Crispo Gallery.
 1955: Butler Institute of American Art, Youngstown, Ohio
 1966: Cleveland Museum of Art, Cleveland, Ohio
 1967: The Hopkins Center, Hanover, New Hampshire
 1968: Kent State University, Kent, Ohio
 1972: Museum of Contemporary Art Jacksonville, Jacksonville, Florida
 1976: La Jolla Museum of Contemporary Art, La Jolla, California
 1977: Columbus Museum of Art, Columbus, Ohio
 1978: Ringling Museum, Sarasota, Florida
 1978: Allentown Art Museum, Allentown, Pennsylvania
 1979: Alex Rosenberg Gallery, New York City, New York
 1979: Clark Art Institute, Williamstown, Massachusetts
 1980: Brooklyn Museum, Brooklyn, New York
 1980: Carnegie Museums of Pittsburgh, Pittsburgh, Pennsylvania
 1984: Heckscher Museum of Art, Huntington, New York
 1984: Canton Art Institute, Canton, Ohio
 1986: Tampa Museum of Art, Tampa, Florida
 2005: Florence Biennale, Fortezza da Basso, Firenze, Italy

Bibliography 

 Anuszkiewicz, Richard and Karl Lunde. "Anuszkiewicz." New York: H.N. Abrams (1977). 
 Alviani, Getulio, Margaret A. Miller and Giancarlo Pauletto. "Richard Anuszkiewicz: Opere 1961-1987." Pordenone: Centro Culturale Casa A. Zanussi (1988).
 Buchsteiner, Thomas and Ingrid Mossinger. "Anuszkiewicz Op Art." Ostfildern: Hatje Cantz Publishers (1997). 
 Kolva, Jeanne, Maxine Lurie (ed.) and Marc Mappen (ed.). Anuszkiewicz, Richard. "Encyclopedia of New Jersey." New Brunswick: Rutgers University (2004). 9780813533254
 Madden, David and Nicholas Spike. "Richard Anuszkiewicz: Paintings & Sculptures 1945-2001: Catalogue Raisonné." Florence: Centro Di Edizioni (2010). 
 Price, Marshall N. "The Abstract Impulse: fifty years of abstraction at the National Academy, 1956-2006." Manchester: Hudson Hills Press (2007). 
 Ratliff, Floyd, Neil K. Rector and Sanford Wurmfeld. "Color Function Painting: The Art of Josef Albers, Julian Stanczak and Richard Anuszkiewicz." Winston-Salem: Wake Forest UJohn Gruen (September, 1979). "Richard Anuszkiewicz: A Beautiful Discourse with Space". ARTnews. University Fine Arts Gallery (1996). 
 Gruen, John (September, 1979). "Richard Anuszkiewicz: A Beautiful Discourse with Space". ARTnews: 68, 69, 72, 73, 74.

References

External links 
 "Op Out of Ohio" review by Ken Johnson for the New York Times
 Richard Anuszkiewicz Pronunciation
 www.richardanuszkiewicz.com
 rogallery.com
 
 www.picassomio.com

1930 births
2020 deaths
Contemporary sculptors
20th-century American painters
American male painters
21st-century American painters
21st-century American male artists
American printmakers
American abstract artists
Yale School of Art alumni
Cleveland School of Art alumni
Cleveland Institute of Art alumni
Op art
20th-century American sculptors
20th-century American male artists
American male sculptors
Artists from Erie, Pennsylvania
Sculptors from Pennsylvania